MTV Base was a British pay television music channel from Paramount Networks UK & Australia that focused primarily on hip hop, R&B, grime, garage, reggae, funk, soul and dance music. It was launched as part of MTV's digital boutique of music channels on July 1, 1999 in both the United Kingdom and in Ireland. 

MTV Base closed on 31 March 2022, and was replaced by MTV 90s. The last video on the channel was "Shutdown" by Skepta.

Regional channels
The channel was previously available in other European countries, but was replaced by the now-defunct MTV Dance (replaced by Club MTV) channel from March 2008.

Pan-European
A pan-European version was planned to launch in 2015.

Africa

MTV Base Africa launched in February 2005 throughout the African continent. On 3 July 2013, Viacom International Media Networks Africa launched an localised feed of MTV Base exclusively for South Africa, with local programming, advertising and VJs.

France

MTV Base was launched in France on 21 December 2007. The channel was replaced by French versions of MTV Hits and BET on 17 November 2015.

Programming
Following the closures of MTV OMG, MTV Rocks and Club MTV on 20 July 2020, MTV Base previously broadcast a weekly chart based on Club MTV programming on Fridays.

Former programming
Super Base Beats
Big Beats & Future Smashes!
Freshest Beats & Bangers
10 Biggest R&B & Rap Anthems RN!
Most Played Videos Of The Week
MTV Asks
 #MTVHottest
Brand New Video!
Black Lives Matter
Happy Birthday (artist)
(artist): On Repeat
(artist): 2 On
(artist): Brand New Vid!
End Of The Road! Farewell From MTV Base!
Club MTV's Big 20 (weekly dance music chart)
 re-rewind ultimate garage Anthems
Old Skool Night
Club MTV: Saturday Night Dance Anthems

Logos

References

External links 
TV Guide
MTV Base UK - presentation, screenshots
SES guide to receiving Astra satellites
SES guide to channels broadcasting on Astra satellites

Defunct television channels in the United Kingdom
MTV channels
Music video networks in the United Kingdom
Television channels and stations established in 1999
Television channels and stations disestablished in 2022
1999 establishments in the United Kingdom
2022 disestablishments in the United Kingdom